Perry Fred Stone Jr. (b. June 23, 1959) is an international evangelist and author living in Cleveland, Tennessee.

Early life and education 
Stone was born on June 23, 1959 in Parsons, West Virginia. His parents were Perry Fred Stone Sr. (1933–2011) and Juanita Jean Stone (née Bava) (1935-2021), and he has three siblings: Diana, Phillip, and Melanie. 

Stone attended Lee University and graduated with a B.A. in theology from Covenant Life Christian College and Theological Seminary, located in Rocky Top (formerly known as Coal Creek and Lake City), Tennessee.

Ministry

Influence 
Stone began preaching at the age of 16. He credits Pentecostal minister T.L. Lowery, who pastored two Church of God congregations in Cleveland, Tennessee, and Washington, D. C., as his role model and mentor.

Ministries 
Stone founded the Voice of Evangelism Outreach Ministries (VOE) in 1985. Parts of VOE include the Omega Center International Conference Center, The Ramp Church, and the International School of the Word, an online school offering Bible classes. His weekly Manna-fest with Perry Stone TV program, which focuses on Biblical prophecy, began airing on the Trinity Broadcasting Network in 2000.

Theology 
Stone describes his theology as threefold:
 "There comes a time of end; not the end of time, but a time of the end. . . . there is a time of the end and an end generation."
 "There are specific signs [in the Bible] indicating when that generation is come." 
 His mission "is to preach those signs to encourage people to come to know Jesus Christ."

Stone teaches that taking Communion daily can bring emotional, physical, and spiritual healing.

Over the years, Stone has claimed to have received prophetic visions about significant events, such as George W. Bush being elected president, the 9/11 attack on the World Trade Center, and Osama Bin Laden's death. Stone has also taught and confirmed the belief that the Cherokee people possess a unique spiritual heritage associated with the Lost Tribes of Israel.

Propagation of conspiracy theories

Gay rights 
In October 2015, Stone alleged that there was a congressional effort under way to criminalize anti-gay speech and actions taken by pastors and churches, leading to fines and imprisonment.

Terrorism 
In December 2015, Stone claimed that ISIS had placed sleeper cells across the southeastern United States and that the organization had warehouses full of weapons in all fifty states.

Watergate 
In a 2018 appearance on evangelist Jim Bakker’s television program, Stone claimed that a government intelligence officer, who was a member of his father's church in northern Virginia, possessed the true knowledge of the Watergate scandal. According to Stone, the person responsible for Watergate was still alive, and if the truth came out, it would destroy the Democratic party.

Donald Trump 
In 2018, Stone claimed to have information about 64,000 emails that proved that the Democratic party conspired with Russia to defeat Donald Trump in the 2016 presidential election. He also accused anti-Trump Democrats of being demon possessed and of "trying to place hexes and curses" on Trump.

Globalism and Satanism 
In a 2018 sermon, Stone pronounced his belief in a "deep state" of globalists who controlled the world's economy and religions. He also stated that an unnamed billionaire told him that globalist political leaders were Luciferians who prayed to Satan before dinner.

COVID-19 
In March 2020, Stone described the COVID-19 virus as God's punishment for abortion, the lack of prayer in public schools, and same-sex marriage. He also alleged that it was an attempt to eliminate older, conservative people in the southeastern United States who opposed the Mark of the Beast so that socialism and communism could take over the United States. Additionally, he said that a government supercomputer "666" was working on a cure. At the same time, Stone dismissed the virus as "media hype, God's retribution on the Chinese," and an excuse for the U.S. government "to implement widespread surveillance of citizens" via the implanting of a microchip that would serve as the Mark of the Beast.

Controversies

Speaking in tongues 
Stone was ridiculed in 2019 after a video clip circulated of a church service he was leading, which showed him checking his cellphone while speaking in tongues. Stone defended himself by explaining that he was texting a friend whose wife had cancer so that she would know he and his congregation were praying for her.

Sexual misconduct allegations 
In April 2020, the Voice of Evangelism board of directors reportedly received letters from eleven individuals, nine of whom were women connected to Stone's ministry, that detailed allegations of sexual harassment and assault. Actions stipulated in the letters included "groping, showing that he was aroused while fully clothed and rubbing himself, asking women in his ministry about their breasts, kissing the women on the neck and lips, asking them to kiss him in similar ways, messaging them to send him pictures and asking them to massage him." According to another report, Stone admitted to having "acted inappropriately with female employees," which he attributed to stress. Stone issued a statement that said, "I have asked God and my precious wife Pam to forgive me. And I humbly and sincerely ask those who are hurt or offended by my actions to also forgive me. It is my hope that by the grace of God we will all be able to walk in healing and restoration." The board of directors instructed Stone to take a sabbatical for actions "that deviated from the biblical standards set in place for VOE leadership." The forced sabbatical included "professional counseling, medical care, removal from social media and absence from ministry for between six and 12 months."After further investigation it was revealed most of the alleged victims never worked at VOE or met Mr Stone.

In December 2021, a Chattanooga, Tennessee, newspaper reported that the FBI was investigating Stone for the sexual misconduct allegations against him, his finances, and his connections to local law enforcement. Stone's ministry denied knowledge of this investigation, and Stone personally suggested that the media had concocted the story to drum up advertising revenue.

Personal life 
Stone married his wife Pamela on April 2, 1982, in Northport, Alabama. They have two children: Jonathan and Amanda.

Books 
Lay It on Me (1998)
Plucking the Eagle’s Wings (2001)
The Meal That Heals: Enjoying Intimate, Daily Communion with God (2002)
Unleashing the Beast: The Coming Fanatical Dictator and His Ten-Nation Coalition (2003)
Unlocking Secrets in the Second Coming Scrolls: Searching for the Time of Christ's Return (2004)
Mystery of the Priesthood and the Blood (2007)
Nightmare Along Pennsylvania Avenue: Prophetic Insight into America's Role in the Coming End Times (2009)
Secrets from Beyond The Grave: A Biblical Guide to the Mystery of Heaven, Hell and Eternity (2010)
How to Interpret Dreams and Visions: Understanding God's Warnings and Guidance (2011)
Is God Trying To Tell You Something (2011)
Purging Your House, Pruning Your Family Tree: How to Rid Your Home and Family of Demonic Influence and Generational Oppression (2011)
The Code of the Holy Spirit: Uncovering the Hebraic Roots and Historic Presence of the Holy Spirit (2012)
Opening the Gates of Heaven: Walk in the Favor of Answered Prayer and Blessing (2012)
Dancing with Snowmen: Restoring Childlike Faith to Adults Who Have Forgotten How to Have Fun With God (2013)
Exposing Satan's Playbook: The Secrets and Strategies Satan Hopes You Never Discover (2013)
The Judas Goat: How to Deal With False Friendships, Betrayals, and the Temptation Not to Forgive (2013)
There's a Crack in Your Armor: Key Strategies to Stay Protected and Win Your Spiritual Battles (2013)
Breaking the Code of the Feasts (2014)
Dealing with Hindering Spirits: When the Warfare Moves from Natural to Supernatural (2014)
Decreeing Your Jubilee (2014)
Financial Security in the Last Days Book: Break The Spirit of Poverty and Lack in your Job, Home, and Family (2014)
The Prophetic Future Concealed in Israel's Festivals: Discover Prophetic Codes Hidden in Israel's Holy Days (2014)
Scarlet Threads: How Women of Faith Can Save Their Children, Hedge in Their Families, and Help Change the Nation (2014)
7 Intimate Secrets: Some Truths Are Only Revealed in Secret (2015)--co-authored with Pam Stone
America's Controversy with God's Covenant: America's Blessings are in Danger of being Lost (2015)--co-authored with Bill Cloud
Anointed with Favor: Discover How to “Be the Head Not the Tail” (2015)
Chronicles of the Sacred Mountain: Revealing the Mysteries of Heaven’s Past, Present and Future (2015)
Deciphering End-Time Prophetic Codes: Cyclical and Historical Biblical Patterns Reveal America's Past, Present and Future Events, including Warnings and Patterns to Leaders (2015)
The Eighth Kingdom: How Radical Islam Will Impact the End Times (2015)
Imparting Generational Blessings: Building A Spiritual Legacy (2015)
Putting On Your God Gear (2015)
Supernatural Provision in the End Times (2015)
We're Not Finished Yet Book: The Personal Memoirs of Perry and Pam Stone (2015)--co-authored with Pam Stone
Prophecies Concealed Now Revealed (2016)
Marked With Promise: Discover God's Plan For You and How to Fulfill The Purpose For Which You Were Born (2017)
The Revelation Generation (2017)
Angels Among Us: What the Bible Reveals about Angelic Encounters (2019)
Now It Can Be Told (2019)
This Season of Angels: What the Bible Reveals about Angelic Encounters (2019)
Breaking the Jewish Code: 12 Secrets That Will Transform Your Life, Family, Health, and Finances (2020)
The Final Ciphers and the Return of Christ: Analyzing Prophetic Cycles and Patterns Based on Ancient and End-Time Ciphers From the Bible and History! (2020)
Secrets of the Third Heaven: How to Find the Map Leading to Your Eternal Destination (2020)
There's A Crack in Your Armor: Key Strategies to Stay Protected and Win Your Spiritual Battles (2020)
America's Apocalyptic Reset: Unmasking the Radical's Blueprints to Silence Christians, Patriots, and Conservatives (2021)
Fishing in the Sea of Forgetfulness (2021)

References 

1959 births
Living people
People from Cleveland, Tennessee
People from Jay County, Indiana
Lee University alumni
American evangelists